Trafford College is a further education college in Trafford, Greater Manchester, England. It was formed with the merger of North Trafford College (formerly, Stretford Technical College) and South Trafford College in 2007.

Campuses and facilities
Trafford College has two campuses: Altrincham Campus and Stretford Campus, plus the Skills Shop based at the Trafford Centre.

Altrincham campus offers A-Levels and a range of vocational courses in Business & Accountancy, Childcare, Creative Arts & Media, Foundation Learning, Hairdressing, Beauty & Spa Therapies, Health & Social Care, Hospitality, IT & Computing, Sport & Uniformed Services, and Tourism and Aviation. Facilities include the Strive Fitness Suite, Enhance Salon & Spa, Aspire Restaurant Bar, and Costa.

Stretford campus is STEM Assured, and has Engineering and Motor Vehicle workshops, a Mitsubishi Industrial Robot, specialist Siemens equipment, Microsoft Imagine Academy, Science labs, and AMC and AM2 Training Centres. It offers a range of vocational courses in Electrical Installation, Electronics, Engineering, Engineering Services for Buildings, Foundation Learning, Gas, Motor Vehicle, Plumbing, Science and A Levels in Applied Science, Biology, Chemistry, English Language, Maths, Physics and Psychology.

The Skills Shop, based at INTU Trafford Centre, offers training programmes to young people in Retail, Hospitality and Customer Service. The hub also provides employers with both staff development and training.

Notable alumni
Morrissey: Singer, Stretford campus when it was Stretford Technical College
Jason Orange: Singer (Returned to do his A-levels at the Altrincham campus after Take That first split).
Pepper Rose: Singer
John Squire: Guitarist, The Stone Roses
Ian Brown: Singer, The Stone Roses
Carly Tait: Wheelchair athlete

References

Buildings and structures in Trafford
Education in Trafford
Further education colleges in Greater Manchester
Further education colleges in the Collab Group
Educational institutions established in 2007
Learning and Skills Beacons
2007 establishments in England